Kathrin Glock (born 26 November 1980) is an Austrian entrepreneur and supporter of animal welfare.

Life 
Kathrin Glock was born and raised in Carinthia, Austria. In July 2011, she married Gaston Glock.

Career 
Since 2010, Kathrin Glock is responsible for the Glock Horse Performance Center. Part of the Dressage Team GLOCK is the world champion Edward Gal, Hans Peter Minderhoud, Nicole Werner and the show jumping equestrian Gerco Schröder. 
 
In the year 2012, Kathrin Glock became a board member of the Glock Ges.m.b.H. She is also part of the IGG Private Foundation and donor of the Gaston and Kathrin Glock Private Foundation. She is also part of the medical advisory board of the Glock Health, Science and Research GmbH and chairwomen of the CSR Advisory Board of Glock Ökoenergie. Furthermore, she was a supervisory board member of AustroControl, the Österreichischen Gesellschaft für Zivilluftfahrt mit beschränkter Haftung (ACG).
 
Since 2010, Kathrin Glock was responsible for the international standing of the two riding centres in Austria and the Netherlands. This contains horse breeding, horse racing and organisation of international tournaments.
 
For the GHPC Austria, Glock is mainly involved in the organisation of a series of international horse racing events called Horses & Stars. Austria's only 5-star-horse racing events take place in the GHPC Austria.
 
In November 2019 Kathrin Glock accepted the Ladies of Year Award for Glock Ökoenerige in her function as chairwoman of the CSR Advisory Board.

Animal rights movement 
Kathrin Glock is a supporter of animal welfare and a vegan. She supports animal rights organizations like the animal sanctuary Gut Aiderbichl in Henndorf, as well as smaller animal welfare organisations and non-profit organizations like the Ronald McDonald House Charities. 
 
Since 2017, the Gaston and Kathrin Glock Private Foundation have been prize donors of the Kärntner Tierschutzpreis, which awards events, associations and private individuals for their achievements in animal protection.

Awards 
 2013: Leading Ladies Award, in the category health and social engagement
 2016: LOOK! Business Award in the category marketing & brand management
 2016: Special prize of the Bundestierschutzpreis of the Austrian department for health and women, presented by secretary Sabine Oberhauser
 2018: Leading Ladies Award, in the category social engagement for animal rights

References 

 

1987 births
21st-century Austrian businesspeople
Animal welfare workers
Living people
People from Carinthia (state)